Marian Horsley née Edith Marian Bagshaw Mann (1893-1958) was an English badminton player. She came to prominence whilst still at school and with a reputation as a fitness fanatic gained 24 England caps. She competed in the All England Championships winning two titles in 1929 and 1931. Twenty years later she won the Berks, Bucks and Oxon title four times, the  last aged 60.

She married Reginald John Horsley in 1916 and played as Mrs Horsley afterwards.

Medal Record at the All England Badminton Championships

References

English female badminton players
1893 births
1958 deaths